Amr Reda Ramadan Hussen ( born 26 August 1997) is an Egyptian freestyle wrestler. He is a bronze medalist at the 2019 African Games and a three-time medalist, including gold, at the African Wrestling Championships. He also won the gold medal in his event at the 2022 Mediterranean Games.

Career 

He won the silver medal in the men's 70kg event at the 2018 African Wrestling Championships held in Port Harcourt, Nigeria. In 2019, he represented Egypt at the African Games held in Rabat, Morocco, and he won one of the bronze medals in the 65 kg event.

He qualified at the 2021 African & Oceania Wrestling Olympic Qualification Tournament to represent Egypt at the 2020 Summer Olympics in Tokyo, Japan. He competed in the men's 74 kg event.

He won the gold medal in his event at the 2022 African Wrestling Championships held in El Jadida, Morocco. He also won the gold medal in the 74 kg event at the 2022 Mediterranean Games held in Oran, Algeria.

Achievements

References

External links 
 

Living people
Place of birth missing (living people)
Egyptian male sport wrestlers
African Games bronze medalists for Egypt
African Games medalists in wrestling
Competitors at the 2019 African Games
African Wrestling Championships medalists
Wrestlers at the 2020 Summer Olympics
Olympic wrestlers of Egypt
1997 births
Mediterranean Games gold medalists for Egypt
Mediterranean Games medalists in wrestling
Competitors at the 2022 Mediterranean Games
21st-century Egyptian people